Dikanda Diba (born 10 October 1966) is a Congolese long-distance runner. She competed in the women's 3000 metres at the 1988 Summer Olympics.

References

External links
 

1966 births
Living people
Athletes (track and field) at the 1988 Summer Olympics
Democratic Republic of the Congo female long-distance runners
Olympic athletes of the Democratic Republic of the Congo
Place of birth missing (living people)
21st-century Democratic Republic of the Congo people